Vicky Hynes (born 30 March 1981), also known as Victoria Lankester, is an English former professional squash player who represented England.

Hynes was born in Ipswich. She reached a career-high world ranking of 32 in March 2003.

References

1981 births
Living people
English female squash players